Golagheh Mordeh (also Romanized as Golāgheh Mordeh; also known as Golākhem Mordeh) is a village in Kuhdasht-e Shomali Rural District, in the Central District of Kuhdasht County, Lorestan Province, Iran. At the 2006 census, its population was 118, in 27 families.

References 

Towns and villages in Kuhdasht County